The Brooklyn Underground Film Festival was an annual showcase of typically low-budget, under-distributed or amateur videos and metavideos.  The festival was initially held in DUMBO, Brooklyn and later moved to Park Slope neighborhood of Brooklyn, New York.  The festival ran from 2002-2007.

The festival also showed the work of emerging non-media artists.  The first festival included a large wheat paste mural by the artist known as Swoon.

History
The festival was founded in 2002 by graduates of Pratt Institute, Josh Koury, Myles Kane, Cris Moris and Gaia Cornwall. It was funded in part by a growing number of local businesses.

The festival ceased operations in 2007.

References

External links
 Official website for the Brooklyn Underground Film Festival
 Watch: Program Director Josh Koury on independentfilm.com

Park Slope
Film festivals in New York City
Underground film festivals
Experimental film festivals
Defunct film festivals in the United States